The Dallas–Fort Worth Film Critics Association Award for Best Director is an award presented by the Dallas–Fort Worth Film Critics Association. It is given in honor of a film director who has delivered an outstanding directing while working in the film industry.

Winners
 † = Winner of the Academy Award for Best Director

1990s

2000s

2010s

2020s

References

External links
 Official website

Director
Awards for best director